Marie-Claude Bierre is a former French figure skater who competed in ladies singles. She is the 1972–77 French champion.

Results

References
 skatabase

Navigation

French female single skaters
Living people
Year of birth missing (living people)
Place of birth missing (living people)